The Grail Psalms refers to various editions of an English translation of the Book of Psalms, first published completely as The Psalms: A New Translation in 1963  by the Ladies of the Grail. The translation was modeled on the French La Bible de Jérusalem, according to the school of Fr. Joseph Gelineau: a simple vernacular, arranged in sprung rhythm to be suitable for liturgical song and chant (see: Gelineau psalmody). All official Catholic English translations of the Liturgy of the Hours use the Grail Psalms.

History  
The Grail Psalms were already popular before the Second Vatican Council revised the liturgies of the Roman rite. Because the Council called for more liturgical use of the vernacular instead of Latin, and also for more singing and chanting (as opposed to the silent Low Mass and privately recited Divine Office, which were the predominantly celebrated forms of the Roman rite before the Council), the Grail Psalms were utilised as the official liturgical Psalter by most of the English-speaking world.

The Grail Psalms were utilized by the International Commission on English in the Liturgy in their translation of The Liturgy of the Hours in 1973. They were also utilized, with some minor alterations, in a parallel translation of the Liturgy of the Hours titled The Divine Office in 1974. As these are the only two officially recognized Roman Catholic translations of the canonical hours in English, the Grail became the de facto liturgical Psalter. Some Episcopal Conferences, such as that of England & Wales, also adopted the Grail for the Responsorial Psalms in the Lectionary for Mass. The Ruthenian Catholic Church, since 2007, has also adopted the Grail Psalms for chanting, in an edition prepared by the Trappist Abbey of the Genesee called The Abbey Psalter.

A separate edition of the Grail Psalms, revised with inclusive language, was produced in 1986. It was expressly forbidden for liturgical use. The 1994 ICEL Psalter issued for study and comment was another alternative to the Grail Psalms, but never approved for liturgical use.  The Imprimatur to this text was later revoked. 

In 2001, Pope John Paul II promulgated the encyclical Liturgiam authenticam, which called for a more literal translation of liturgical texts. This led to an interest in updating the Grail. In 2008, Conception Abbey completed a wide-scale revision in accordance with this instruction, published under the title The Revised Grail Psalms. The 2008 version is used in the edition of The Liturgy of the Hours published by Paulines Publications Africa, now promulgated for use in every Bishops' Conference of Africa.

In 2010, the Holy See granted  of The Revised Grail Psalms with certain modifications; the current modified edition of 2010 is the one in force for several Bishops' Conferences including the United States Conference of Catholic Bishops.

In the General Assembly of the USCCB of November 2014, the U.S. Bishops voted to adopt a further revision of the Revised Grail Psalms. In 2019 the USCCB acquired the rights to the Revised Grail from the monks of Conception Abbey, and released a new revision titled Abbey Psalms and Canticles, which "will gradually be incorporated into the Church’s official liturgical books."

Example comparison between the Grail (1963) and Revised Grail (2010)
From Psalm 63 (62):2–9.

Notes

References

External links
The Grail Society
Online Liturgy of the Hours using the 1963 Grail Psalms
Conception Abbey
The Revised Grail Psalms online, GIA Publications

Bible translations into English
Psalters
1963 non-fiction books